Boz-Uchuk is a village in the Ak-Suu District of Issyk-Kul Region of Kyrgyzstan. Its population was 1,243 in 2021.

References

Populated places in Issyk-Kul Region